Saaheem Malik Valdery (born February 24, 1997), better known as SahBabii, is an American rapper, singer, and songwriter from Atlanta, Georgia. His song, "Pull Up Wit Ah Stick" featuring Loso Loaded, gained widespread popularity after its release on his S.A.N.D.A.S. mixtape in 2017. SahBabii peaked at No. 8 on Billboards Next Big Sound chart in July 2017.

Early life

Saaheem Malik was born in Chicago, Illinois and raised in the city's south side in the Wentworth Gardens projects. His aunt, TeeBaby, gave him the moniker "SahBabii" at a young age. In early 2010 at the age of 13, his family moved to Atlanta, Georgia in pursuance of his older brother T3's career in music. They moved to Sylvan Hills and lived on Osborne Street.

Career

Saaheem began recording music under the name 'SahBabii' shortly after arriving in Atlanta. His older brother, T3, helped produce his songs, and SahBabii released two early mixtapes: Pimpin Ain't Eazy (2012) and Glocks & Thots (2013).

After a nearly three-year hiatus and whilst working at Dick's Sporting Goods, SahBabii released a follow-up mixtape, S.A.N.D.A.S., in 2016. S.A.N.D.A.S. was recorded on the music software program, Cubase, using a broken microphone in T3's bedroom. The mixtape featured the single, "Pull Up Wit Ah Stick" featuring rapper Loso Loaded, which went viral on Instagram after SahBabii posted a 15-second clip of the song before its release.

Soon after, the song made headlines and garnered millions of plays on SoundCloud. The music video for the song was released in February 2017 and is currently sitting at over 70 million views on the WorldStarHipHop YouTube channel. In March 2017, SahBabii reportedly signed a $2 million record deal with Warner Bros. Records. His family also founded the production company, Casting Bait Music Group, and SahBabii's father, Delval, became his manager.
 
"Pull Up Wit Ah Stick" was later remixed by Young Thug, T-Pain, Fetty Wap and Wiz Khalifa. The song was later remixed by Lil Wayne which was released on the Dedication 6 mixtape. Drake also expressed interest in adding a verse of his own to the official remix of the song. SahBabii was flown to London, UK by Young Thug where he met also Drake.

In May 2017, it was announced that SahBabii would be remastering and re-releasing S.A.N.D.A.S. with new tracks on the Warner Bros. label. S.A.N.D.A.S was mainly remastered by audio engineer Alex Tumay and partially by T3, with Tumay remastering tracks 2, 3, 6, 8, 10, 11, and 12, and T3 remastering tracks 4, 5, 7, and 9. It was also announced that producer Mona Scott-Young was interested in shooting a reality television show centered on SahBabii and his family.

Shortly after the end of the S.A.N.D.A.S. press run, SahBabii's professional relationship with Warner Bros. Records came to an end.

His breakthrough full-length project, Squidtastic was released in 2018. This was followed up by the EP 3P, in 2019.

In early 2019, SahBabii publicly stated that he would retire. However, he decided against this, "because of the fans". He stated, "I couldn't just turn my back on them. I'ma still retire, though. But I just wanted to make sure I give my fans the most music I can give them before I stop".

On July 8, 2020, SahBabii released the album BarNacles. Complex described the album as putting "the focus squarely on SahBabii's distinctive, dreamlike sound. With surreal production and off-kilter vocals, Barnacles is a unique look into what makes his music so appealing". His song Purple Umbrella samples "Star-Stealing Girl" from the Chrono Cross Original Soundtrack by Yasunori Mitsuda.

In February 2020, SahBabii was featured on rapper Trippie Redd's project A Love Letter to You 4 (Deluxe) on the song 'Amazinggg.' On September 16, 2020, SahBabii released his single "Gates to the Sun (POLLEN Singles)" featuring Japanese musician Joji on Spotify. In November 2020, SahBabii was featured on rapper Nav's mixtape project Emergency Tsunami, on the song 'Do Ya Deed'.

He made an appearance in early 2021 on the track Solitaires with Ateyaba.

Sahbabii's debut studio album, Do It For Demon, was released on October 27, 2021. The album is named after and dedicated to his late friend 'DemonChild' who was killed in a shooting in 2020. In an interview with Acclaim Magazine in December 2021, SahBabii mentioned that Do It For Demon was the first of his projects that was recorded on professional equipment and that him and T3 built an entirely new studio for it. Mic (media company) described the album as "a rousing showcase of the artist's vulnerability", while noting that "the sexual animal references and unpredictable ad-libs that OG fans love are still warranted space".

On December 6, 2022, alongside a massive list of other Hip-Hop artists, SahBabii was the subject of having 41 of his songs leaked and circulated online. On December 26, 2022, SahBabii would post on his Snapchat account, "I've been workin on a new project that's coming very soon next year. None of my most recent music has leaked. Enjoy "LeaKout" until that day comes I appreciate the love." On December 27, 2022, SahBabii released the project LeakOut consisting of music that had been leaked online in the weeks prior.

On January 31st, 2023, SahBabii released a single titled "How Bout U?"

Influences
In an interview with XXL, Hypebeast, and Acclaim Mag SahBabii cited T3, Future, Young Thug, Rich Homie Quan, Ca$h Out and Nujabes as his main influences.

Controversies

Feud with rapper Offset 
In May 2017, rapper Offset from the group Migos posted a video on his Instagram account criticizing the recent trend of hip-hop/rap artists wearing inverted crosses jewelry, "All y'all niggas wearing upside down crosses, these are my little partners man...stop that shit boy, you look lame. All that worship the devil shit. Get with God, man." 

SahBabii angrily responded to Offset on his Instagram account with a post of a screenshot from the original video Offset posted, writing in the caption, "Nigga You Look Lame Fuck You Talm Boud My Cross Gon Stay Upside Down Y'all Niggas Donate $1,000 to Washington But Will Throw $10,000 in a Club I Will Beat Yo Ass." He also made another post with the caption, "Show These Niggas Respect Now Fuck Migos!! We Ain't Going For No Disrespect Nobody Asked This Lame Ass Nigga Opinion."

Offset later responded to SahBabii by posting a video where he claims SahBabii is not affiliated with PDE (Paradise East Apartments in Atlanta, Georgia), Slaughter Gang, the Mob, and is not originally from Atlanta, Georgia and also his jewelry is not authentic. He also mentioned that he will come to SahBabii's neighborhood and have SahBabii's own neighborhood associates beat him up. SahBabii then responded in a video where he claims Offset instigated this argument, and then he called Offset a 'faggot' for wearing pigtails and dyeing his hair various colors throughout his career. SahBabii continued in another video where he claims his inverted crosses jewelry is not sacrilegious but it is symbolic of the self-created ideology he believes in called 'Unknownism' which aims to seek the truth.

A month later in June 2017, SahBabii conducted an interview with DJ Drama and spoke about his negative interactions with Offset and how Offset should not be speaking down on his young musical peers, "But I feel like he don't need to be speaking down on people. I don't speak on no other religions or nothing like that, so I don't think he should be speaking down on young people."  He also expressed regret for even responding to Offset's original video as he claims to be a person who does not engage in any feuds or arguments, "I wish I wouldn't never even responded to that, because I ain't the type to do all that Internet beef."

Discography

Studio albums
 Do It for Demon (2021)

Mixtapes
 Pimpin Ain't Eazy (2012)
 Glocks & Thots (2013)
 S.A.N.D.A.S (2016)
 S.A.N.D.A.S. (Remastered) (2017)
 Squidtastic (2018)
 Barnacles (2020)
 LeakOut (2022)

Extended plays
 3P (2019)

Singles

References

Further reading
 Rolling Stone interview June 2017

Southern hip hop musicians
Rappers from Atlanta
Rappers from Chicago
Rappers from Georgia (U.S. state)
African-American male rappers
21st-century American singers
21st-century American rappers
Living people
1997 births
21st-century American male singers
21st-century African-American musicians